Grohman and Grohmann are surnames, and may refer to:

People
 Henryk Grohman (1862–1939), Polish industrialist
 William Adolf Baillie Grohman (1851–1921), an author and pioneer in British Columbia
 Claudia Grohmann (born 2002), "Queen of Germany" (see Miss Germany)
 Jorge Basadre Grohmann (1903–1980), Peruvian historian
 Patricia Grohmann (born 1990), German volleyballer
 Paul Grohmann (1848–1908), Austrian mountaineer
 Tim Grohmann (born 1988), German rower
 Will Grohmann (1887–1968), German art critic

Other uses
 Grohman Narrows Provincial Park, a provincial park in British Columbia, Canada
 Grohmann Knives, a Canadian knife company; see Zytel
 Grohmann Museum, Milwaukee, Wisconsin, United States
 Jorge Basadre Grohmann National University, Tacna, Peru
 Tesla Grohmann Automation GmbH, German engineering company

See also
 Grohmannspitze (Grohmann Peak) a mountain in Italy
 Baillie-Grohman Canal, a canal in British Columbia, Canada